The Roman Catholic Diocese of Mangochi is a diocese located in the city of Mangochi in the Ecclesiastical province of Blantyre in Malawi.

History
 May 29, 1969: Established as the Apostolic Prefecture of Fort Johnston from the Diocese of Zomba
 September 17, 1973: Promoted as Diocese of Mangochi

Leadership
 Prefect Apostolic of Fort Johnston (Roman rite) 
 Father Alessandro Assolari, S.M.M. (1969.10.03 – 1973.09.17 see below)
 Bishops of Mangochi (Roman rite)
 Bishop Alessandro Assolari, S.M.M. (see above 1973.09.17 – 2004.11.20)
 Bishop Luciano Nervi, S.M.M. (2004.11.20 – 2005.03.08)
 Bishop Alessandro Pagani, S.M.M. (2007.04.03 - 2013.12.06); resigned (under Canon 401.1 of the Latin Rite 1983 Code of Canon Law)
 Bishop Monfort Stima (2013.12.06 - present); appointed by Pope Francis; formerly, Titular Bishop of Puppi and Auxiliary Bishop of the Roman Catholic Archdiocese of Blantyre

See also
Roman Catholicism in Malawi

References

External links
 GCatholic.org
 Catholic Hierarchy

Roman Catholic dioceses in Malawi
Christian organizations established in 1969
Roman Catholic dioceses and prelatures established in the 20th century
Roman Catholic Ecclesiastical Province of Blantyre